Sergei Nikolayevich Zhurikov (21 November 1980 – 2 May 2014) was a commander of the Donbas People's Militia in the secessionist Donetsk People's Republic during the war in Donbas. He was killed in the siege of Sloviansk fighting against Ukrainian government forces.

Biography 
Zhurikov was born in Sevastopol (Crimea) on November 21, 1980. Before the Russo-Ukrainian War he served as a sacristan in Kyiv Pechersk Lavra.

During the Russo-Ukrainian War he joined separatist forces under the nom de guerre "Romashka" ("Daisy"), and became one of the leaders of Sloviansk militia.

Death 
During the early morning on 2 May 2014, Ukrainian government forces launched a large-scale operation to retake the city of Sloviansk, starting the second offensive. During the fighting in the center of Sloviansk Sergei Zhurikov was shot by a sniper of the Ukrainian army in May 2, 2014. After death he was buried in Seredyna-Buda, Sumy Oblast of Ukraine.

Legacy 
Russian poet  dedicated a poem to Sergei Zhurikov called "Ballad of a Sexton".

See also 
 Igor Strelkov – main leader of the separatist forces in Donbas.
 Arsen Pavlov – another leader of separatist forces in Slavyansk, who replaced Sergei Zhurikov after his death.

References

1980 births
2014 deaths
People from Sevastopol
People of the Donetsk People's Republic
Pro-Russian people of the 2014 pro-Russian unrest in Ukraine
Pro-Russian people of the war in Donbas
Military personnel killed in the Russo-Ukrainian War
People murdered in Ukraine
Deaths by firearm in Ukraine
Ukrainian collaborators with Russia